Entre Deux Guerres may refer to:
 French for the interwar period between World War I and World War II (1918–1939)
 A chronological grouping for a collection of short stories within Manhattan Monologues by Louis Auchincloss